A round of regional elections in Italy took place during 2013 in seven regions out of twenty including Lazio, Lombardy and Molise (24 and 25 February), Basilicata (17 and 18 November), and three autonomous regions: Friuli-Venezia Giulia (21 and 22 April), Aosta Valley (26 May), Trentino-Alto Adige/Südtirol (27 October).

Overall results

Results by region

Lazio

Lombardy

Molise

Friuli-Venezia Giulia

Aosta Valley

Trentino-Alto Adige

Trentino

South Tyrol

Basilicata

References

Elections in Italian regions
2013 elections in Italy
February 2013 events in Italy
April 2013 events in Italy
May 2013 events in Italy
November 2013 events in Italy